The National Association of Family Entertainment Centers (NAFEC) is a division of the International Laser Tag Association, Inc. (ILTA), the non-profit trade group for the laser tag industry that started in 1996. NAFEC is the non-profit developer and operator association for the family entertainment industry. They help members become better informed through research, services, and communications with all levels of the industry. NAFEC has three levels of memberships: Developer, Operator and Supplier.

NAFEC as of 2011 has over 200 members nationwide. They provide members with up to date data on safety, operations, marketing, seminars, trade shows and much more.

NAFEC works closely with the lawmakers of the US to ensure that new and existing laws do not infringe on the rights of its members.

History
The birth of NAFEC came after the 2009 dissolution of the premier FEC trade association the International Association for the Leisure and Entertainment Industry (IALEI) and subsequent merger with IAAPA.  This new organization was started with many industry recognized and award-winning businesses and vendors.  Some of those people include board members Jay Tritely from Alley Cats, Arlington TX, Jarett Waite from Laser Mania Family Fun Center, St. George, UT, Davor Franicevich from Laser Tag of Baton Rouge, Laser Tag of New Orleans

Reference List

Laser tag
Entertainment industry associations
Trade associations based in the United States